Snellville is a city in Gwinnett County, Georgia, United States, east of Atlanta.  The population was 18,242 at the 2010 census, and in 2019 the estimated population was 20,077. It is a developed suburb of Atlanta and a part of the Atlanta metropolitan area, and is located roughly 35–40 minutes east of Downtown Atlanta via US-78 and Interstate 285.

History

English settlers
In 1874, Thomas Snell and James Sawyer, seventeen-year-old friends from London, secretly planned a voyage to the New World. On March 18, James Sawyer and his brother, Charles, left England. However, Snell's parents, having learned of the plan, wouldn't allow him to leave, thus delaying his departure. The Sawyer brothers arrived in New York on April 1, and after a few weeks headed toward Athens, Georgia, and then to Madison County, where they stayed and worked on a farm for $10 a month. Snell did eventually follow his friends to New York and made his way south to meet them. The three then made their way through Jefferson and Lawrenceville. Shortly after Snell's arrival, Charles left for Pennsylvania, later returning to the South and settling in Alabama, where he went into the turpentine business. James had gone also, in search of his brother, leaving Snell to work on the farm of A. A. Dyer.

Unable to find his brother, James Sawyer returned to New York and began work on a farm near the Hudson River area until his 21st birthday in 1878, when he returned to England to claim his inheritance. Shortly following, in August 1879, he returned to Americus, Georgia, and then Gwinnett County. Once in Gwinnett County, Sawyer found Snell in the small settlement then known as New London, near Stone Mountain. In the homestead that Snell now referred to as Snellville, the two built a small wood frame building and started a business together, Snell and Sawyer's Store, similar to the one in which they were employed in London. As was common in small mill towns of the time, they printed store money with the trade value and Snell's likeness on the front that regular customers could use to purchase goods. By the end of 1879, the business was prospering and catering to customers from the neighboring towns of Lawrenceville and Loganville. Travelers would buy supplies at "Snell and Sawyer's" and often spend the night in the nearby oak groves, as the trip was too great for one day's travel. It is uncertain when New London officially became Snellville, but the location of the partners' store was referred to as Snellville in their advertising, and the young town began to show a promising future.

The partnership later dissolved, and Sawyer kept the old store, building granite stone above and around the old frame and then disassembling the wood frame from within. Snell built a new store of granite. In 1883 Sawyer built a home and married Emma Webb, of the historic Snellville Webb family, on November 15. Sawyer opened Snellville's first post office in 1885 and served as postmaster from the back of his store.

Snell died at age 39 in 1896 due to complications following an appendicitis operation. He was buried in Brownlee Mountain, presently known as Nob Hill, and was later reburied in nearby Lithonia.

Initially forced into partial retirement due to failing eyesight, Sawyer later lost his sight completely. After that time the store was owned and operated by various merchants. It was eventually destroyed in 1960 and replaced by a service station. James Sawyer died in 1948 at age 91 and is buried in the Baptist Cemetery (now Snellville Historical Cemetery).

City beginnings

The City of Snellville received its charter from the General Assembly of the State of Georgia in 1923.

Recent times

As of the 2010 census, Snellville's population was 18,242 and included 7,069 housing units. Snellville's political system now includes a mayor and five council members. There are over 100 employees working for the city of Snellville, which operates from five departments: Administration, Parks & Recreation, Planning & Development, Public Safety, and Public Works.

As of early 2011, new housing construction, much of it upscale, continues in Snellville and in areas of southern Gwinnett County carrying a Snellville address. This is the only area of metro Atlanta where this is occurring on such a large scale, despite the recession.  Also, the upscale Governor's Walk neighborhood in Snellville went on to be completed after the recession was well under way. Though many of the spec homes in Governor's Walk went into repossession during the recession, all were bought and completed, or were in the process of being completed, as of January 2011. Lake Norris had new upscale construction going on as of January 2011 with two new homes under construction and several major remodelings in progress. There was abundant new construction occurring along Centerville Highway as well, as of January 2011. On Norris Lake Way, a collection of homes in the million dollar range continued to sell as of 2011, making it one of the few areas of the metro where upscale new construction was still selling well.

Hightower Trail and other areas of southern Gwinnett County continue to see new construction as well. New and finished resell homes in Governor's Walk and the Lake Norris area and on acreage in southern Gwinnett County continued to sell strongly during the recession, often for near pre-recession prices. Georgia MLS statistics back this metro Atlanta anomaly, and many feel the area's good luck during the foreclosure crisis occurred because Snellville remained strong economically during the recession, and is a popular relocation area for locals of the metro Atlanta area resettling from other suburban areas.

City land swap
   In early November 2000, then-mayor Brett Harrell began negotiating a land swap to transform an abandoned supermarket into a municipal complex and the now-former City Hall into part of a church campus. The old Kroger in the Oakland Village Shopping Center on U.S. 78 across from Snellville United Methodist Church and City Hall was just one of several dead or dying shopping centers plaguing Snellville. Abandoned big-box stores had become enough of an eyesore to make them a major issue in the 1999 city elections. Harrell had campaigned on a platform that included efforts to revitalize vacant retail space.

The project was not without its opponents. Among the concerned were tenants of the half-occupied Oakland Village Shopping Center that the city would take over, and who would be forced to relocate. The City Council voted unanimously that November to proceed with the exploration of a potential land swap. There was concern that timing could become an issue and kill the deal in the early stages. The owner of the shopping center wanted to sell his property by the end of 2000, while the City Council decided to take no action for a six-month period. Some citizens expressed concerns about the project at the City Council meeting and asked for the deal to be put to a referendum.

On March 5, 2001, the city held its first public hearing on the land swap. Over 100 citizens attended the meeting to support the idea, while more than a dozen showed up to oppose it. A few cited a recent $79,000 roof job on City Hall, and the fact that the swap would benefit the church more than the city, as reasons to back out of the deal.

On March 26, 2001, the City Council met to vote on the land swap proposal. At this meeting, the citizens were given a few specifics of the deal. According to the Council, the Oakland Village Shopping Center was worth $2,700,000, and the current City Hall was worth $2,300,000. Councilman Jerry Oberholtzer estimated that renovation of the shopping center for city use would be in the $2,500,000 range. He also estimated that to renovate City Hall for future needs would run the city the same cost. More opponents than supporters spoke at the meeting, and a few senior citizens presented a petition against relocating their center which was part of the land swap plan. The City Council voted 3–1 in favor of the swap; Councilman Troy Carter was the only dissenting vote.

As preparation for the swap began, the city hit a snag in June 2001 when it was revealed that there was a possibility of perchloroethylene soil contamination from an old dry cleaner site in the Oakland Village Shopping Center. The Georgia Department of Natural Resources Environmental Protection Division responded that even in the event of contamination, a clean-up may not be required if no one lives close enough to the site or no one is using the ground water in the area. The city did discover the use of a well by a private citizen within a one-mile (1.6 km) radius of the site. This citizen, Harold "Cotton" Willams, refused a $25,000 deal from the Methodist Church to cap the well. In response, the city began exploring a local ordinance banning the construction of new wells and closing any existing ones. The city council voted on June 25 to adopt the ordinance but still allow the use of the well for irrigation. The city council also decided to include the realignment of Oak Road and Henry Clower Boulevard at U.S. 78 in the land swap project.

In July 2001 the land swap hit another snag. A lawyer representing the Nash Family of Snellville filed a lawsuit claiming the city could not trade one of the parcels because the city didn't own it. The Nash family contended it owned the approximately  tract and the unused building sitting on it. In 1935, Horace J. Nash deeded the building to the Georgia Rural Rehabilitation Corporation for use as a vocational center. The building was used to train unemployed workers during and after the Great Depression. Later, the city used the site for a jail, a senior center and an agricultural building. Most recently, the building housed Recorder's Court. Attorney Bill Crecelius said the Nash family had let Snellville use the building for decades without complaint. This issue was resolved when the city presented documents verifying its ownership of the title to the building as well as title insurance.

In July 2003, the last piece of a $6,700,000 building plan for the project fell into place. The Snellville City Council approved funding for a multipurpose complex combining municipal functions and police services, plus offering a public gathering spot. In a 4–2 vote, the council approved certificates of participation, a series of leases that are to be renewed annually until they are paid off in 20 years. The leases, with an interest rate of slightly more than 4 percent, will cost the city about $10 million when they are paid off in two decades. Mayor Brett Harrell, Mayor Pro Tempore Melvin Everson and council members Jerry Oberholtzer and Deborah Rich voted for the funding program. Council members Robert Jenkins and Mike Smith cast dissenting votes. In the final plan, the land swap would include an  project encompassing a new City Hall, police department, senior center and public forum area.

Groundbreaking for the new city hall began in March 2004 with the demolition of the Oakland Village Shopping Center. Hogan Construction Group of Norcross was awarded the $7,400,000 contract to construct both the new City Hall and new Senior Center. The original completion date was pushed back because of poor weather conditions. Crews also had to blast granite under the building foundation, further delaying the project and adding $200,000 to the cost.

On March 12, 2006, the city officially dedicated the new City Hall, located at the corner of Oak Road and Main Street East (US 78). Mayor Jerry Oberholtzer was quoted that arriving at the dedication day took "five years, four elections, three architectural firms and two lawsuits". The city hopes to one day expand the complex by adding a parking deck and a new public safety annex.

On August 13, 2007, the City Council awarded a $52,000 contract to Smithco Construction of Gainesville to demolish and remove the remaining piece of the old Oakland Village Shopping Center. The area has now been converted into an open green space.

2017-2018 City Funds Misuse Controversy
Former Mayor Tom Witts had been under close watch since 2013 for alleged tax evasion, owing tens of thousands of dollars in state taxes. On September 7, 2017, Witts was indicted on 66 counts, included allegations that he “consistently underreported income and over-reported deductions” on tax returns; that he used more than half of his 2015 mayoral campaign funds on expenses like cruises, plane tickets and adult entertainment websites; and that Witts’ company completed multiple jobs for the city of Snellville, a violation of state law. Witts' original sentence was reduced due to poor health, negating any jail time to house arrest. Mayor Pro Tem Barbara Bender will be sworn in as mayor until an election can be called.

Towne Center @ Snellville

In February 2011, the City of Snellville hired engineering firm Clark, Patterson and Lee in conjunction with renowned urban planning firm Duany Plater-Zyberk & Company to begin the process of planning a new town center for the suburban community. A weekend-long design charrette was held to engage the community in the process. The plan that emerged from this visioning process provides a new town green and shopping district, bordered by neighborhoods that incorporate a variety of housing types. The plan takes into account the Continuous Flow Intersection that had previously been planned by the Georgia Department of Transportation. A key element of the new town design is a system of bridges and tunnels that create a more walkable city.

Government and politics
The City of Snellville operates under a council-manager form of government.  The city manager is appointed by the council and works with them on policy creation and then manages staff concerning implementation.  Comparing this form of government to a private business, the mayor acts as chairman of the board and the city council acts as the board of directors.  The city manager, under the direction of the city council, manages the day-to-day functions of the city. The city's mayor, Tom Witts, was elected to a four-year term in 2015. In late 2018, Mayor Witts was suspended (following his 2017 indictment) due to misuse of funds, spending them on travel and adult websites.

Elections
Every two years, half of the elected council is up for election. In 2017, three city council seats will be up for election.

Unlike the county, state and national elections, where voting is done by precinct, all city elections take place at City Hall.

Infrastructure

Transportation

Major roads
 U.S. Route 78
 State Route 84
 State Route 124
Ronald Reagan Parkway

Pedestrians and cycling

 Ivy Creek-Snellville Trail (Proposed)

Public transportation

Route 418 of the Xpress bus service, a joint venture between Gwinnett County Transit and the Georgia Regional Transportation Authority (GRTA), provides commuter bus service to downtown Atlanta from Snellville in the morning, and vice versa in the afternoon. Seven departure times are available in the morning and seven in the afternoon, Monday-Friday, via Stone Mountain Freeway (U.S. 78) to I-285 and I-20. The morning westbound route terminates at the Civic Center MARTA Station. The afternoon eastbound route terminates at the First Baptist Church of Snellville, with a stop at the Hewatt Road Park&Ride.

Gwinnett County Transit is also testing a micro-transit service in the Snellville area.

History
Buses first ran on the morning of April 2, 2007. In that first month, the route had a total of 1,783 riders. In May, there was a 40% increase to 2,520. On many mornings, the bus is standing room only. On August 21, 2007, the Gwinnett County Board of Commissioners approved an agreement with GRTA to add five new Motor Coach Industries D4500CL buses to the route.

Medical centers
Snellville has one major hospital, Eastside Medical Center, formerly Emory Eastside Medical Center, which serves the southern Gwinnett County Region.

Media

Newspapers
Atlanta Journal-Constitution (major regional paper)
Gwinnett Daily Post

Radio

Television

Geography
Snellville is located in southern Gwinnett County at  (33.858439, −84.006324). U.S. Route 78 runs through the center of the city, leading west  to downtown Atlanta and east  to Monroe. Georgia State Route 124 crosses US 78 in the center of Snellville, leading north  to Lawrenceville and south  to Lithonia. Some unincorporated areas in the eastern edge of DeKalb County and western Rockdale County have a Snellville mailing address, but are not a part of the City of Snellville.

Climate
Snellville (along with the rest of the Atlanta metropolitan area) has a humid subtropical climate according to the Köppen classification, with generally hot, humid summers and mild winters by the standards of most of the U.S.

Compared to most large cities around the world at approximately the same latitude (33°39'), such as Beirut, Casablanca, Dallas, Los Angeles, and Phoenix, Snellville has lower average winter temperatures. The primary reason for this is that the North American continent extends into high latitudes that allows systems to form and move eastward and southward without obstruction by major mountain ranges. Other factors include Snellville's distance from large bodies of water; its higher elevation, which can lead to rapid weather changes; prevailing wind patterns; and extensive tree cover, which reduces the urban heat island effect (an advantage during summer).

In the winter, weather systems sweeping south from Canada, through the Midwest, bring temperatures that can reach below 25 °Fahrenheit (−3.9 °Celsius) a few times a year. The lowest temperature recorded in the city is −9 °F (−22 °C), reached on February 13, 1899. It also reached  twice and  once in Atlanta in the 1980s and 1990s. An average year sees frost on 48 days; snowfall, which occurs most years, averages 2 inches (5 centimeters) annually. The greatest single accumulation of snow was 10 inches (25 centimeters), on January 23, 1940. A more prominent issue in winter are the frequent ice storms that can cause more problems than snow; the most severe such storm may have occurred on January 7, 1973. Also during winter, warm air sometimes flows from the Gulf of Mexico, raising temperatures as high as 75 °F (24 °C).

Though summers are humid, actual temperatures are lower than they may feel, with afternoon highs peaking at about 90 °F (32 °C) in late July. Temperatures rarely reach 100 °F (38 °C), which, during the last 30 years, was recorded in 1980, 1983, 1986, 1993, 1995, 2000, and 2007. The highest temperature recorded in the city is 105 °F (40.6 °C), reached on July 13 and 17, 1980.

Like the rest of the Southeastern U.S., the Atlanta metropolitan area experiences abundant rainfall, which is relatively evenly distributed throughout the year. Average annual rainfall is 50.5 inches (127 centimeters); the only other major U.S. cities with greater rainfall are Miami, Florida, and New Orleans, Louisiana.

Parks

Thomas W. Briscoe Park consists of 87 developed acres (100 total acres), just south of the city center on Lenora Church Road.  The park hosts numerous activities for youth and seniors including summer camp, swim lessons, soccer and senior trips.

Lenora Park and Disc Golf Course encompasses  of land on Lenora Church Road.

South Gwinnett Athletic Association consists of six baseball and softball fields, one football field, and 40,000 square feet of indoor sporting rink use for roller hockey, volleyball, indoor soccer, and lacrosse.

People and culture

Demographics

2020 census

As of the 2020 United States census, there were 20,573 people, 6,093 households, and 4,853 families residing in the city.

2010 census
As of 2010 Snellville had a population of 18,242.  The racial and ethnic composition of the population was 61.0% white, 30.0% black or African American, 0.3% Native American, 1.5% Asian Indian, 0.01% other Asian, 0.1% Pacific Islander, 2.7% from some other race and 2.6% reporting two or more races.  7.4% of the population was Hispanic or Latino of any race.

2000 census
As of the census of 2000, there were 15,351 people, 5,256 households, and 4,315 families residing in the city. The racial makeup of the city was 89.64% White, 5.39% African American, 0.25% Native American, 2.03% Asian, 0.02% Pacific Islander, 1.58% from other races, and 1.09% from two or more races. Hispanic or Latino of any race were 4.09% of the population.

There were 5,256 households, out of which 38.2% had children under the age of 18 living with them, 70.3% were married couples living together, 9.0% had a female householder with no husband present, and 17.9% were non-families. 15.0% of all households were made up of individuals, and 7.2% had someone living alone who was 65 years of age or older.  The average household size was 2.87 and the average family size was 3.18.

In the city, the population was spread out, with 26.6% under the age of 18, 7.3% from 18 to 24, 27.4% from 25 to 44, 26.5% from 45 to 64, and 12.3% who were 65 years of age or older.  The median age was 39 years. For every 100 females, there were 91.5 males.  For every 100 females age 18 and over, there were 89.2 males.

The median income for a household in the city was $62,537, and the median income for a family was $68,341. Males had a median income of $52,340 versus $41,587 for females. The per capita income for the city was $26,131.  About 2.1% of families and 2.0% of the population were below the poverty line, including 3.3% of those under age 18 and 5.0% of those age 65 or over.

Slogan 
In 2010, the city leaders of Snellville voted to adopt a new slogan for the city. The previous slogan, "Snellville, where everybody is somebody," had been established 30 years prior. The current (new) slogan is an evolution of the old and is "Snellville, where everybody is proud to be somebody."

Snellville Days Festival

The Snellville Days Festival is a two-day event held annually that draws crowds from all over the Southeast. The annual celebration is touted as being one of the top 20 tourism events in May according to the Southeastern Tourism Society, but still has a small-town flavor.

Education

Schools

Public schools
The following schools serve the Snellville area and are part of the Gwinnett County Public Schools:
Brookwood High School
Alton C. Crews Middle School
Brookwood Elementary School
Craig Elementary School
Five Forks Middle School
Gwinn Oaks Elementary School
R. D. Head Elementary School
Grayson High School
J. P. McConnell Middle School
Pharr Elementary School
W. J. Cooper Elementary School
Bay Creek Middle School
Grayson Elementary
Trip Elementary
Shiloh High School
Shiloh Middle School
Anderson-Livsey Elementary School
Annistown Elementary School
Centerville Elementary School
Shiloh Elementary School
Henry Partee Elementary School
South Gwinnett High School
Grace Snell Middle School
J.C. Magill Elementary School
Rosebud Elementary School
Snellville Middle School
R. L. Norton Elementary School
W. C. Britt Elementary School

Private schools
Evergreen Montessori School
Gwinnett Christian Academy, grades K5–12
Harbour Oaks Montessori School, grades K2–12

Public libraries
Gwinnett County Public Library operates the Elizabeth H. Williams Branch in Snellville.

Notable people
 Matt Beaty, baseball player
 Clay Cook, singer/songwriter, member of the Zac Brown Band, writer of songs for John Mayer
 Rennie Curran, football player for the Tennessee Titans
 Diana DeGarmo, 2004 American Idol runner-up
 David Greene, football player for the New England Patriots
 Kyle Lewis, baseball player
 Josh Okogie, professional basketball player for the Minnesota Timberwolves
 Melissa Ordway, actress; plays Abby Newman on The Young and the Restless
 David Pollack, football player for the Cincinnati Bengals
 Amy Robach , Good Morning America news anchor
 Cameron Sample, professional football player for the Cincinnati Bengals
 Nakia Sanford (1995), former forward/center in the WNBA
 Eric Shanteau, member of USA swim team, 2008 Summer Olympics
 Sound Tribe Sector 9, band now located in the Bay Area of California
 Lou Williams, former basketball player
 Garrett Whitlock, American professional baseball player
 Tyler Wolff, professional soccer player

References

External links
 City of Snellville official website
 Georgia.gov Information on Snellville

Cities in Georgia (U.S. state)
Populated places established in 1923
Cities in Gwinnett County, Georgia